The following elections were held in the year 1805.

North America 

 1805 elections in the United States by state
 1805 United States House of Representatives elections
 1805 United States Senate elections
 1805 Pennsylvania gubernatorial election
 1805 Tennessee gubernatorial election
 1805 United States House of Representatives elections in Tennessee
 1805 United States House of Representatives elections in Virginia
 1805 North Carolina's 5th congressional district special election
 1805 Pennsylvania's 4th congressional district special election
 1805 Pennsylvania's 11th congressional district special election
 1805 Delaware's at-large congressional district special election
 1804–1805 United States House of Representatives elections in Vermont

1805
1805-related lists
1805 elections